Leonid Vitalyevich Mironov (born 14 September 1998) is a Russian football player.

Club career

He made his debut in the Russian Football National League for FC Spartak-2 Moscow on 24 March 2018 in a game against FC Luch-Energiya Vladivostok.

He made his debut for the main squad of FC Spartak Moscow on 21 October 2020 in a Russian Cup game against FC Yenisey Krasnoyarsk.

References

External links
 
 
 Profile by Russian Football National League

1998 births
People from Zhukovsky, Moscow Oblast
Sportspeople from Moscow Oblast
Living people
Russian footballers
Association football defenders
FC Spartak Moscow players
FC Spartak-2 Moscow players
Russian First League players
Russian Second League players